Sichi (also Romanized as Sīchī; also known as Sāyech and Sūnūchi) is a village in Emamzadeh Abdol Aziz Rural District, Jolgeh District, Isfahan County, Isfahan Province, Iran. At the 2006 census, its population was 179, in 47 families.

References 

Populated places in Isfahan County